Ben Loory (born July 11, 1971) is an American short fiction writer. He is the author of the collections Stories for Nighttime and Some for the Day (Penguin, 2011) and Tales of Falling and Flying (Penguin, 2017), as well as a picture book for children, The Baseball Player and the Walrus (Dial Books for Young Readers, 2015). Loory’s stories have appeared in The New Yorker, Tin House, Electric Literature, and Fairy Tale Review, and been heard on This American Life and Selected Shorts. He lives in Los Angeles and teaches short story writing at the UCLA Extension Writers’ Program.

Education 
Raised in Dover, New Jersey, Loory attended Dover High School.

Loory graduated from Harvard University magna cum laude in 1993 with a BA in Visual & Environmental Studies, and earned an MFA in Screenwriting from the American Film Institute in 1996.

Short fiction and other writing 
Loory's first collection, Stories for Nighttime and Some for the Day, was published by Penguin in 2011. It was a Fall Selection of the Barnes & Noble Discover Great New Writers Program and an August Selection of the Starbucks Coffee Bookish Reading Club. Loory's second collection, Tales of Falling and Flying, was published by Penguin in 2017. It earned a starred review from Kirkus, was called "mesmerizing and magical" by NPR, and was named a Favorite Book of the Year by the staff of the Paris Review.

Loory's work has also appeared widely in magazines and journals, including Tin House, Electric Literature, Kenyon Review, and Gargoyle Magazine. Loory's story "The TV," first published in the April 12, 2010 issue of The New Yorker, was named a Distinguished Story of the Year in The 2011 Best American Short Stories anthology.

Three of Loory's stories ("The Duck," "The Man and the Moose," and "Death and the Fruits of the Tree") have been heard on This American Life, and many more have been performed at Selected Shorts and WordTheatre. On December 12, 2018, a dance adaptation of Loory's story "The Cape," choreographed by Gabrielle Lamb of Pigeonwing Dance, was performed at Symphony Space in New York as part of the Selected Shorts "Dance in America" event. 

As a screenwriter, Loory has worked for Jodie Foster, Alex Proyas, Mark Johnson, and others. He has also contributed creative non-fiction to the online arts and culture magazine The Nervous Breakdown.

Music 
Loory is also a musician. He was a member of Soda & his Million Piece Band, in which he played mandolin and baritone saxophone. Their music was featured in the soundtrack for the film Waitress (2007), directed by Adrienne Shelly.

Works
 Stories for Nighttime and Some for the Day (2011)
 The Baseball Player and the Walrus (2015)
 Tales of Falling and Flying (2017)

References

External links
 Ben Loory's author website
 Ben Loory's facebook author page
 The New Yorker: Book Bench
 Kirkus Reviews: Starred Review of Stories for Nighttime and Some for the Day
Kirkus Reviews: Starred Review of Tales of Falling and Flying
 AV Club Review: Stories for Nighttime and Some for the Day
 Then Disappear & Then Rise Again: An Interview with Ben Loory
Ben Loory reading his story "The Dodo"
Ben Loory on This American Life
 Ben Loory on The Leonard Lopate Show (audio interview)

1971 births
21st-century American short story writers
American male writers
Harvard University alumni
Living people
People from Dover, New Jersey
Writers from New Jersey